Alain Cuypers (born 29 November 1967 in Ostend) is a retired Belgian hurdler. Competing in both the 110 and 400 metres hurdles, he represented his country at the 1988 Summer Olympics as well as two outdoor and two indoor World Championships.

International competitions

Personal bests
Outdoor
110 metres hurdles – 13.63 (-0.3 m/s, Brussels 1992)
400 metres hurdles – 49.53 (Brussels 1989)
Indoor
60 metres hurdles – 7.71 (Karlsruhe 1993)

References

All-Athletics profile

1967 births
Living people
Belgian male hurdlers
Athletes (track and field) at the 1988 Summer Olympics
Olympic athletes of Belgium
Sportspeople from Ostend